Ralph Harold Kohlmann is an American lawyer and retired United States Marine Corps officer.

Education
Raised in Wyckoff, New Jersey, Kohlmann is a 1976 graduate of Ramapo High School.

Military career
For his first seven years as an officer, Kohlmann served as a combat engineer.
He switched to the Judge Advocate General Corps in 1987.

Service in Guantanamo for the Office of Military Commissions
On December 18, 2005 Kohlmann was announced as a Presiding Officer for the Guantanamo Military Commissions.

On Friday January 6, 2006 the Department of Defense
officially appointed Kohlmann to preside over Binyam Mohammed's military commission.
In its ruling in Hamdan v. Rumsfeld the United States Supreme Court ruled that President George W. Bush lacked the constitutional authority to create military commissions.

The Supreme Court had ruled that the United States Congress did have the constitutional authority to create military commissions, and Congress subsequently passed the Military Commissions Act of 2006 a few months later, re-instituting military commissions very similar to the earlier Presidentially authorized commissions.

On December 13, 2007, the New York Times reported that Kohlmann was appointed to serve as a Chief judge by the Office of Military Commissions.

Ordered Peter Brownback's replacement

On May 29, 2008 an e-mail from Kohlmann announced that a new officer was appointed to replace Peter Brownback.
The initial lack of explanation triggered commentators to question Brownback's firing.
Captain Andre Kok, a spokesperson for the Office of Military Commissions, claimed there had been "a mutual decision between Col. Brownback and the Army that he revert to his retired status when his current active-duty orders expire in June."

Commenting on this issue, the American Civil Liberties Union pointed to Brownback's decision to wait until the Prosecution complied with his order to make public Khadr's detention records—which may have substantiated his claims his incriminating statements were the product of abuse.  They wrote the Pentagon "is unwilling to let judges exercise independence if it means a ruling against the government."

In writing about Kohlmann's reassignment of the Khadr case, the Washington Post asked readers to:

Subsequently, The Pentagon claimed that the decision that Brownback would resign was mutual. But Kohlmann issued a statement on June 2, 2008, that Brownback had been willing to continue to serve as a military judge. Brownback was a retired officer who had been recalled to active duty in 2004 to serve as the first judge on the first Military Commissions.  Kohlmann said "My detailing of another judge was completely unrelated to any actions that Col. Brownback has taken in this or any other case. Any suggestion that Col. Brownback asked to return to retired status before the case of US v. Khadr was completed is also incorrect."

Lieutenant Commander William Kuebler, Omar Khadr's assigned military lawyer, noted that authorities had been advertising for new officers to volunteer to serve on the Military Commissions, and called the decision "odd to say the least".
According to Carol J. Williams, writing in the Los Angeles Times Kuebler said:

Khalid Sheikh Mohammed trial
In September 2008, he presided as the judge at the trial of Khalid Sheikh Mohammed.

Marine Corps Retirement
In November 2008, Department of Defence officials announced that Kohlmann was relinquishing his duties as the Military Judge in the military commissions of the 9-11 hijackers.
Due to his impending retirement, Kohlmann detailed Colonel Stephen Henley, U.S. Army, to replace him as the Military Judge in the 9-11 cases.  Kohlmann continued to serve as the Chief Judge of the Military Commissions until December 2008.  He was succeeded in that position by Colonel James Pohl, U.S. Army.  Kohlmann accepted a position as a civilian attorney in the Department of the Navy Office of General Counsel in January 2009.

Civilian life

At it 2012 annual meeting the American Bar Association hosted a presentation entitled "The Renewed Trials by Military Commission Under the Obama Administration: An Historical Perspective".
Kohlmann and several other current and former key figures in the military commission system participated in the presentation.

See also

Guantanamo military commission Presiding Officers

References

External links
"Forum Shoppers Beware the Mismatch Between the Military Tribunal Option and United States National Security Strategy", Naval War College paper
Wyckoff native offers an inside look at the Guantanamo Bay terror trial

1958 births
Living people
United States Naval Academy alumni
United States Marine Corps officers
Widener University School of Law alumni
American military lawyers
Naval War College alumni
Guantanamo Military Commission members